Charmosyna is a genus of parrots in the family Psittaculidae.  The three currently recognized species inhabit moist forests on the island of New Guinea.

Taxonomy

Charmosyna contains the following three species:

 Josephine's lorikeet (Charmosyna josefinae)
 Papuan lorikeet (Charmosyna papou)
 Stella's lorikeet (Charmosyna stellae)

The genus formerly included twelve additional species: pygmy lorikeet (Charminetta wilhelminae), red-fronted lorikeet (Hypocharmosyna rubronotata), red-flanked lorikeet (Hypocharmosyna placentis), blue-fronted lorikeet (Charmosynopsis toxopei), fairy lorikeet (Charmosynopsis pulchella), striated lorikeet (Synorhacma multistriata), duchess lorikeet (Charmosynoides margarethae), Meek's lorikeet (Vini meeki), red-chinned lorikeet (Vini rubrigularis), palm lorikeet (Vini palmarum), red-throated lorikeet (Vini amabilis), and New Caledonian lorikeet (Vini diadema). These were moved to other genera based on the results of a molecular phylogenetic study of the lorikeets published in 2020.

Photographs

References

 
Bird genera
 
Taxa named by Johann Georg Wagler
Taxonomy articles created by Polbot